was an mid-Edo period Japanese samurai, and the 10th daimyō of Sendai Domain in the Tōhoku region of northern Japan, and the 26th hereditary chieftain of the Date clan.

Biography
Narimune was the posthumous second son of Date Narimura; his mother was a concubine and he was born at the clan's Sodegasaki residence in Edo. His childhood name was Norisaburō (徳三郎) later Shōjirō (総次郎). In 1804, he was moved to the clan’s primary residence in Edo, and he came down with chickenpox the same year, but recovered. In 1809, his elder half-brother, Date Chikamune was highly disfigured by smallpox, and went into seclusion until his death in 1812. During this period, Narimune appeared in all official functions in his place. He was adopted as Chikamune’s heir in 1812, and changed his name to Date Munezumi. Later that same year, after Chikamune died, he was received in formal audience by Shōgun Tokugawa Ienari, who presided over his genpuku ceremony, and who granted him a kanji from his name. He also received the Court rank of Junior Fourth, Lower Grade and courtesy titles of Mutsu-no-kami and Sakonoe-shōshō as had been held by his father. In 1814, he was wed to the daughter of Tokugawa Harutomi, daimyō of Kii Domain.  

He fell ill in June 1819 and died a month later at the age of 22. As he had no male heir, the son of Tamura Murasuke, daimyō of Ichinoseki Domain was posthumously adopted as his heir.

Family
 Father: Date Narimura
 Mother: Onobu no Kata (1779–1800)
 Wife: Tokugawa Nobuko (Shinkyou’in) (1795–1827)
 Concubine:Tsuda-dono
 Concubine: Watanabe-dono
 Children (mother unknown):
 1st son: Makomaru, died in childhood
 1st daughter: Shibahime, married Date Nariyoshi, daimyo of Sendai Domain

References
Papinot, Edmond. (1948). Historical and Geographical Dictionary of Japan. New York: Overbeck Co.

External links
Sendai Domain on "Edo 300 HTML" (3 November 2007) 

1796 births
1819 deaths
Tozama daimyo
Japanese Buddhists
Date clan
People of Edo-period Japan